Glaenocorisa is a genus of water boatmen in the family Corixidae. There are at least 2 described species in Glaenocorisa.

Species
 Glaenocorisa cavifrons (Thomson, 1869)
 Glaenocorisa propinqua (Fieber, 1861)
 Glaenocorisa quadrata Walley, 1930

References

 Thomas J. Henry, Richard C. Froeschner. (1988). Catalog of the Heteroptera, True Bugs of Canada and the Continental United States. Brill Academic Publishers.

Further reading

External links
 NCBI Taxonomy Browser, Glaenocorisa

Glaenocorisini
Nepomorpha genera